The American Synesthesia Association (ASA) is a not-for-profit academic and public society whose mission is to foster and promote the education and the advancement of knowledge of the phenomena of synesthesia, a neurological condition in which stimulation in one sensory modality leads to experiences in a second, unstimulated modality. The ASA attempts to promote and provide a means for the people who experience and/or study synesthesia to be in contact with each other. As part of its educational mission, the ASA provides information to scientists, health professionals, academicians, researchers, artists, writers, musicians, lay persons and people who experience synesthesia.

Membership
The society currently includes about 200 members. Membership is open to anyone interested in the study of synesthesia, who experiences synesthesia, or who uses synesthesia in their art or published works. As public awareness of synesthesia has grown, the number of members has increased.

History
The American Synesthesia Association was created in 1995 by Carol Steen and Patricia Lynne Duffy after discovering, through correspondence with Simon Baron-Cohen, that there were other people in the New York metropolitan area who experienced synesthesia. The ASA was born out of a desire to meet other synesthetes, and to improve communication between synesthetes and researchers.  

In 2000, the ASA was incorporated and received provisional status, 501(c)(3) in 2001. In 2005, the ASA received permanent 501(c)(3) status, and is now a Public Charity under the IRS tax code.

The Board Members of the ASA are Sean A. Day, Peter Grossenbacher, emeritus, Lawrence E. Marks, Daphne Maurer, and Carol Steen.

Meetings
As of 2013, the ASA has held ten major conferences, with attendees from around the world, but mostly from the United States and Europe.  The first meeting of the ASA was held at Princeton University in 2001 with the attendance of numerous synesthesia researchers including Larry Marks, Vilayanur S. Ramachandran, Peter Grossenbacher, and artists and authors including Patricia Lynne Duffy and Natasha Lvovich.  This meeting was featured in the popular press, including Time magazine and other media outlets. The first conference also became the subject of a documentary video.  Since 2002, the ASA has instituted a keynote speaker, who gives an hour long lecture linking synesthesia with other domains of research.  In 2011, the University of California, San Diego became the first location to host the ASA annual meeting twice (2002, 2011).

See also
 History of synesthesia research
 UK Synaesthesia Association

Notes

External links
  Official web site

Synesthesia
Psychology organizations based in the United States